QRC may refer to:

 QRC is the Q code for "What is your true bearing?"
 Queer Resource Center - A name commonly given to LGBT student centers on college campuses
 Quick Response Code (QR Code)